Non-citizens or Aliens in Latvian law are individuals who are not citizens of Latvia or any other country, but who, in accordance with the Latvian law "Regarding the status of citizens of the former USSR who possess neither Latvian nor other citizenship", have the right to a non-citizen passport issued by the Latvian government as well as other specific rights. Approximately two thirds of them are ethnic Russians, followed by Belarusians, Ukrainians, Poles, and Lithuanians.

The non-citizens are "citizens of the former USSR (...) who reside in the Republic of Latvia as well as who are in temporary absence and their children who simultaneously comply with the following conditions: 1) on 1 July 1992 they were registered in the territory of Latvia regardless of the status of the living space indicated in the registration of residence, or up to 1 July 1992 their last registered place of residence was in the Republic of Latvia, or it has been determined by a court judgment that they have resided in the territory of Latvia for 10 consecutive years until the referred to date; 2) they are not citizens of Latvia; and 3) they are not and have not been citizens of another state." as well as "children of [the aforementioned] if both of their parents were non-citizens at the time of the birth of the children or one of the parents is a non-citizen, but the other is a stateless person or is unknown, or in accordance with the mutual agreement of the parents, if one of the parents is a non-citizen, but the other – a citizen of another country".

Children born after Latvia reestablished independence (August 21, 1991) to parents who are both non-citizens are entitled to citizenship upon request of either parent.

While the issue of non-citizens is often equated to the problem of statelessness, other sources consider that the status of non-citizen in both Latvia and Estonia is unique and has not existed previously in international law.

The "non-citizens" of Latvia enjoy a benefit not afforded to its citizens of being able to travel to both the Schengen Area and Russia without a visa (see Visa requirements for Latvian non-citizens). However, the "non-citizens" are allowed to stay in other Schengen Area countries for no more than 90 days within any 180-day period (whereas Latvian citizens can stay indefinitely in any Schengen or EU country). Moreover, the "non-citizens" cannot legally work in other EU countries without a work permit.

Demography

According to the population census, in March 2011, there were 290,660 non-citizens living in Latvia or 14.1% of Latvian residents, down from approximately 715,000 in 1991. According to the Population Register, in January 2011, 326,735 non-citizens resided in Latvia.

The data of the Population Register, as at January 2022, showed 195,159 non-citizens living in Latvia (9.56% of residents). By far the largest ethnic group of all non-citizens are Russians, who make up 65.5% of all non-citizens, 13.7% are Belarusians, 9.9% are Ukrainians, 3,5% are Poles and 2,4% are Lithuanians. Among the largest ethnic groups in Latvia 0,04% of all ethnic Latvians are non-citizens, as are 26% of Russians, 45% of Belarusians, 41% of Ukrainians, 17% of Poles, 20% of Lithuanians, 22% of Jews, 4% of Roma and 17% of Germans. Additionally, 4,397 non-citizens were registered as living outside Latvia.

In the age group below 18, non-citizens form 2.1% of residents; among adults - 14.2%; in the age group above 90, 25.0%, as at 2015.  As at 2020, the majority of non-citizens, 62.3%, live in the three biggest cities of country: Riga, Daugavpils and Liepāja, which comprise 41.3% of Latvia's population. As at January 2016, 42.92% of the non-citizens were born in Latvia.

The referendum held in October 1998 eliminated the "windows" system, which limited the age groups allowed to naturalize each year. It also gave the right to children of non-citizens born in Latvia after August 21, 1991, to be registered as citizens without naturalisation barring imprisonment or other citizenship. Parents can request citizenship for their children until age 15, after which a child can make the request on their own behalf from age 15 to 17.

Since January 1, 2020, Latvian citizenship is granted automatically to all children born in Latvia no matter what status their parents have (citizens or non–citizens).

Status
According to the Constitutional Court of Latvia,
 15. After the passing of the Non-Citizen Law a new, up to that time unknown category of persons appeared – Latvian non-citizens. Latvian non-citizens cannot be compared with any other status of a physical entity, which has been determined in international legal acts, as the rate of rights, established for non-citizens, which does not comply with any other status. Latvian non-citizens can be regarded neither as citizens, nor aliens or stateless persons but as persons with "a specific legal status" (..) 17. (..) the rights and international liabilities, determined for the non-citizens testify that the legal ties of non-citizens with Latvia are to a certain extent recognized and mutual obligations and rights have been created on the basis of the above

The Latvian parliament created the category of non-citizen in 1991 when it affirmed legal continuity with Latvia's original citizenship laws. Individuals who were citizens of Latvia as of June 17, 1940, prior to Soviet occupation, were once again recognized as citizens, along with their descendants. The law also grants citizenship to all permanent residents of Latvia, who do not hold another citizenship and are either Latvians or Livonians, or individuals (along with their children up to age 15), who have completed universal primary or secondary education with Latvian as the language of instruction. That effectively limited non-citizen status to largely Russophones arriving during the Soviet era.
Notably this included some of those that had elected the parliament in question.

To deal with the issue of former Soviet citizens without Latvian citizenship, the law On the Status of those Former USSR Citizens who do not have the Citizenship of Latvia or that of any Other State was adopted in 1995 as a temporary measure pending the resolution of changing citizenship regimes in the now independent former Soviet republics.

The issue of non-citizens has been equated to the problem of statelessness. Non-citizens have been described as stateless by the OSCE Parliamentary Assembly and by Amnesty International. Non-citizens are named as an example of problems of statelessness by Commissioner for Human Rights, although conceding that non-citizens may not prefer citizenship for their children, and the UN Special Rapporteur on contemporary forms of racism, racial discrimination, xenophobia and related intolerance recommends Latvia "revisit the existing requirements for naturalization with the objective of facilitating the granting of citizenship to non-citizens, implementing the commitments established by the 1961 Convention on the Reduction of Statelessness." Latvian Ombudsman Romāns Apsītis has considered the "specific legal status" of non-citizens to be questionable from the viewpoint of international law.

By definition in Latvian law, non-citizens are not stateless. While they have rights akin to citizens, for example, the right to reside in Latvia without visas or temporary residence permits, rights in other areas are curtailed. Non-citizens cannot vote, although they can participate to a lesser degree in public policy through NGOs. Pension rights are limited, and non-citizens cannot hold certain positions in local and national government, the civil service, and other governmental entities. Non-citizens are exempt from military service, which was compulsory for male Latvian citizens until 2006. UN Committee on the Elimination of Racial Discrimination described non-citizens' position as discriminatory in 1999.

With regard to international law, non-citizens are not considered stateless by the EU Network of Independent Experts on Fundamental Rights, which notes (emphasis added):
... in Latvia, non-citizens under the 1995 Law on Status of citizens of the former USSR who are not citizens of Latvia or any other country are neither citizens, nor foreigners, nor stateless persons. A great proportion of the large Russian-speaking population of the country falls within this category, unknown in public international law. The same applies to non-citizens in Estonia.

The rights of Latvian non-citizens outside of Latvia are governed strictly by treaty. For example, non-citizens now travel visa-free in the EU under Schengen just as Latvian citizens do; both have access to Latvian consular services abroad. (Citizens of foreign countries residing in Latvia do not enjoy this privilege.) Outside the EU, numerous countries allow visa-free travel for Latvian citizens but not for non-citizens.

Peter Van Elsuwege, a scholar in European law at Ghent University, states that the Latvian law is grounded upon the established legal principle that persons who settle under the rule of an occupying power gain no automatic right to nationality. A number of historic precedents support this, according to Van Elsuwege, most notably the case of Alsace-Lorraine when the French on recovering the territory in 1918 did not grant citizenship to German settlers despite Germany having annexed the territory 47 years earlier in 1871.

Naturalisation

Non-citizens may naturalize provided that they have been permanent residents of Latvia for at least 5 years, demonstrate Latvian language competency, correctly answer questions regarding Latvia's Constitution and history—including that it was occupied by the Soviet Union (a question debated in Latvian Russian press) and know the words to the Latvian national anthem. Former members of foreign military, people convicted of propagating fascist or communist ideas or inciting ethnic hatred, and individuals considered hostile to the Republic of Latvia cannot be granted citizenship. The government can refuse naturalisation to individuals who have fulfilled requirements if they are found to be disloyal. This was challenged by Petropavlovskis v. Latvia at the European Court of Human Rights, but in 2015 the court unanimously decided that such refusals are legal.

As of June 30, 2010, 134,039 people have been naturalized, mostly former non-citizens. The naturalization rate reached its height over 2004–2006, peaking in 2005 (19 169 naturalized), and has fallen off substantially since then across all ethnic categories (2080 naturalized in 2009).

A survey conducted and published in 2003 by the Naturalization Board indicated that categories of non-citizen most likely to naturalize were: socially active, aged 25 to 50, female, completed higher education, employees in local or national government, and anyone living in Riga and its environs. The factors cited as to why people have not pursued citizenship were:

34.2% — people deserve citizenship automatically 
26.2% — hoping naturalization will be simplified 
26.2% — travel to the Commonwealth of Independent States is easier for non-citizens
23.5% — concerns about passing the Latvian competency test 
21.6% — no particular need
20.5% — concerns about passing the Latvian history test
20.2% — cost of fees 
18.1% — not enough time
17.9% — naturalization is demeaning 
Less than 9% —  preference for citizenship other than Latvian

Politics of citizenship
The Popular Front of Latvia supported the notion that long-term residents of Latvia who declare their will to obtain citizenship of Latvia and clearly connect their destiny with the state should become citizens.

According to SKDS research, in 2005 45.9% of inhabitants (but only 38.4% of citizens) supported granting voting rights for non-citizens at municipal elections, against such amendments were 35.6% of inhabitants (and 42.8% of citizens). 74.6% of Russian-speaking respondents and 24.8% of ethnic Latvian respondents expressed support for this idea, a negative attitude to it was shown by 7.8% of Russian-speaking respondents and 55.9% of ethnic Latvian respondents.

Nowadays, the Harmony Party supports making naturalization and citizenship for some categories of non-citizens easier to obtain. The Latvian Russian Union, supportive of these steps, also supports the idea of a "zero option", or giving citizenship for all "non-citizens" unconditionally. On the other side, the National Alliance calls for a halt to naturalization. Most of the ruling parties support the status quo. LPP and LC claimed in 2007, that they support voting rights for non-citizens in local elections, but offered a referendum on the issue in 2009, to be held at the same time as local elections, and do not support the respective proposals in Parliament now.

The international community expresses slightly different views on the question. The OSCE mission monitoring the 2006 parliamentary elections mentioned that 

A resolution of the Parliamentary Assembly of the Council of Europe in November 2006 found:

International recommendations to Latvia, which concern non-citizenship, include:
granting voting rights for non-citizens in local elections;
facilitating naturalization;
reducing differences in rights between citizens and non-citizens;
avoiding asking those applying for naturalization to express convictions that are contrary to their reading of the history of their cultural community or nation.

The Russian Foreign Ministry regularly charges Latvia with serious violations of the rights of its Russophone population, describing non-citizens as "stateless";. In responding to charges of discrimination, Latvian authorities contend there is little practical difference between citizens and non-citizens, the primary ones being that non-citizens cannot vote and that non-citizens are exempt from military service.

The Russian Foreign Office has published a collection of international recommendations to Latvia concerning the minority rights, including those on the non-citizenship issue. Russia itself has allowed most Latvian non-citizens short trips without visas since June 2008. This step was criticized by Latvian MFA, but welcomed by the Secretary-General of CoE T. Davis. Earlier, Latvian citizens were charged more for a Russian single-entry visa than non-citizens (more than five times the fee as of December 2007) seen by T. Malmlof as rewarding if not encouraging statelessness.

Council of Europe 
As reported by the European Commissioner for Human Rights 2007 report on Latvia, in 2006 there were 411,054 non-citizens, 66.5% of them belonging to the Russian minority (per §30). While applications of children born after August 21, 1991, are reviewed under a simplified procedure, "over 13 000 children are still non-citizens, and, children are still being born as non-citizens" (per §37,38). Commissioner has noted that "the exclusion of non-citizens from political life does nothing to encourage their integration" (§43). As reported, "the continued existence of the status of non-citizen" mostly held by representatives of national minorities is "deeply problematic in terms of real or perceived equality and social cohesion" (§29).

The Commissioner noted that not all non-citizens may wish to gain citizenship status but did not explore this possibility further. His report also contained clarifications provided by the Latvian government in response, including:
 re §30. As of "2007 there are 386 632 non-citizens in Latvia, less than 17% of the population of Latvia." The report inappropriately conflates Russophones into one minority. Only 28.2% of the population is ethnic Russian and more than half (56.6%) are citizens. Latvia is devoted to strengthening all minorities including ones which suffered under Russification, e.g., Ukrainians and Belarusians.
 re §43. NGOs and all members of society can participate in policy-making. "Consultative support for national minority NGOs has been ensured.... The Latvian authorities do not consider that granting voting rights at local level to non-citizens in Latvia would strengthen the incentive to naturalise; the contrary is much more likely. In fact, an extensive research project entitled The effect of regional aspects on tackling citizenship issues carried out by the Naturalisation Board revealed that one of the major obstacles for applying for Latvian citizenship is the lack of motivation, including the negligible differences between the rights of citizens and non-citizens. Latvia prefers having many citizens with full rights to having many non-citizens with many rights, at the same time acknowledging that any restrictions must have strong justification and shall be in accordance with international standards.   Furthermore, there are no international standards on voting rights to non-citizens and at present it is not a widely accepted practice among the CoE Member States. In Latvia, it is a constitutional matter."

The Commissioner attributed that there are still large numbers of non-citizens, particularly with regard to children, to "lack of commitment" on the part of Latvian authorities, whose response was that Latvia is materially committed to the rights of its minorities, and that from a practical standpoint there is little additional benefit and motivation to become a citizen versus remaining a non-citizen.

See also
Russians in Latvia
Poles in Latvia
Visa requirements for Latvian non-citizens
Andrejeva v. Latvia, a court case concerning the calculation of retirement pensions for non-citizens of Latvia
Estonian nationality law
Non-citizen US Nationals - American Samoans,  who are US nationals but not US citizens.
British National (Overseas)
Izbrisani

References

Further reading

External links
From Latvian government websites:
Law On the Status of those Former USSR Citizens who do not have the Citizenship of Latvia or that of any Other State, as of 2010
Information on non-citizens from Latvian Office for Citizenship and Migration affairs
Judgement of Latvian Constitutional court on losing non-citizen's status, 2005
Statistics of naturalization 1995-2010
2008 data on ethnicity and legal status of inhabitants of Latvia
From Latvian Russian Union party website:
The Last Prisoners of the Cold War, book by Greens/EFA,  2006
Citizens of a Non-Existent State Latvian Human Rights Committee, 2011 (second edition)
Citizens of a Non-Existent State Latvian Human Rights Committee, 2008
International Recommendations on Voting Rights for the Latvian Non-citizens Latvian Human Rights Committee, 2010
Citizenship Law as amended in 2013 (no more amendments made as at April, 2020), includes general rules for naturalization
Roxburgh A. Citizenship row divides Latvia BBC News, 2005
List of some bilateral and international Agreements, discriminating against non-citizens (until 2000)
Jean-Claude Frécon Local democracy in Latvia: the participation of non-citizens in public and political life at local level, 2008. CPL(15)7REP. Report for the Congress of Local and Regional Authorities of the Council of Europe

Politics of Latvia
Human rights in Latvia
Latvian nationality law
Statelessness